The Hall-Crull Octagonal House, also known as the Walter Crull Farm, is an historic octagon house located in Washington Township, Rush County, Indiana.  It was built in 1855, and is a two-story, frame dwelling with a rear addition constructed in 1865.  It features a recessed two-story porch on the front facade supported by octagonal columns.

It was listed on the National Register of Historic Places in 1984.

See also
 List of Registered Historic Places in Indiana

References

Octagon houses in the United States
Houses on the National Register of Historic Places in Indiana
Houses completed in 1855
Buildings and structures in Rush County, Indiana
National Register of Historic Places in Rush County, Indiana
1855 establishments in Indiana